Eckel Industries is an acoustics noise control company founded 1952 in Cambridge, Massachusetts. The company engineers and constructs anechoic (echo-free) sound chambers.

Noteworthy Projects
Largest anechoic chamber ever constructed at General Electric in Pittsfield, Massachusetts
World's quietest room, located at Orfield Labs in Minneapolis, Minnesota. The Orfield Labs chamber was certified by the Guinness Book of World Records in 2005 as the quietest room on Earth.
The Eckel anechoic chamber located at Microsoft in Redmond, Washington was certified by the Guinness Book of World Records as the quietest place on earth in 2015, measuring -20.6 dB.

References

Companies based in Cambridge, Massachusetts
Manufacturing companies based in Massachusetts
Manufacturing companies established in 1952
1952 establishments in Massachusetts